Nyabiku Central Forest Reserve is one of the heavily encroached forest reserves in the region which stretch for over 3.4km. It is found in Kibaale district of Uganda, in the sub-counties of Mugarama and Nyamarunda.

Kibaale District
Forest reserves of Uganda